The maple leafblotch miner (Cameraria aceriella) is a moth of the family Gracillariidae. It is known from Quebec and Ontario in Canada and Connecticut, Illinois, Kentucky, Pennsylvania, Wisconsin, Maine, Maryland, Michigan, New York, and Vermont in the United States.

The wingspan is 7–9 mm. Adults are on wing from the end of May to June.

The larvae feed on Acer species, including Acer rubrum and Acer saccharinum. They mine the leaves of their host plant. They mine into the parenchyma, just under the upper surface of the leaf. Later, they wrap silk around part of their mines to pupate. Part of the population overwinters in the larval form inside leaves that have fallen to the ground and pupate the following spring. The other part overwinters as pupae.

This species was first described by American entomologist James Brackenridge Clemens in 1859.

References

External links
microleps.org

Cameraria (moth)

Moths of North America
Lepidoptera of Canada
Moths described in 1859
Taxa named by James Brackenridge Clemens
Leaf miners
Lepidoptera of the United States